Speer Morgan (born January 25, 1946, in Fort Smith, Arkansas) is an American novelist, short story writer, and editor.

Life

His parents were Charles Donald and Betty (Speer) Morgan. Morgan attended the University of the South in Sewanee, Tennessee, from 1964 to 1966, as well as the University of Arkansas in Fayetteville, where he received a BA in 1968. He received a PhD in 1972 from Stanford University.

Morgan was assistant professor at the University of Missouri in Columbia, Missouri from 1972 to 1978, was associate professor beginning in 1978, and is currently a professor of English and editor of The Missouri Review. He also taught at the Moberly Area Junior College (a men's correctional facility) in 1977 and was a member of the literature panel for the National Endowment for the Arts from 1975 to 1979.

Morgan has won several awards, including the Best Story of the Year award from Prairie Schooner in 1978, for "Internal Combustion." He was a fiction fellow for the National Endowment for the Arts in 1994. He won an American Book Award from the Before Columbus Foundation in 1999 for The Freshour Cylinders and a Lawrence Foundation Prize in 2000 for "The Girl."  His story "The Big Bang" received the Goodheart Prize for Shenandoah’s best story of 2008. Morgan has contributed short stories to several other magazines and journals, including Harper’s, the Atlantic Monthly, Northwest Review, New Letters, River Styx, and Iowa Review.

Morgan has been editor-in-chief of The Missouri Review,  since 1980. He also co-edited of The Best of the Missouri Review (University of Missouri Press, 1991) and For Our Beloved Country: Diaries of Americans in War (Atlantic Monthly Press, 1993).

Morgan has been a visiting writer at the University of Texas, the University of Arkansas, and the Paris Writers Workshop. He currently lives in Columbia, Missouri, with his wife Kristine, a writer and teacher.

In 2019, Morgan was awarded the Distinguished Literary Achievement Award by the Missouri Humanitaries Council.

Awards
NEA Individual Fellowship in Fiction, 1990–91, based on novel manuscript-in -progress, "The Whipping Boy "
 Foreword Magazine's Silver Award, for The Freshour Cylinders
 1999 American Book Award, for The Freshour Cylinders
 Catherine Paine Middlebush Professor of Humanities, University of Missouri, 09/2001 through 09/2003
 Lawrence Foundation Prize in 2000 for "The Girl," Prairie Schooner, Fall 2000
 Goodheart Prize for best story of 2008,"The Big Bang," Shenandoah, 58.3.

Works

Editor
 Editor, The Missouri Review, 1980-

In the mid-1980s, Morgan established TMR Online on a commercial site called The Source, making it the first magazine in the world to have an online site.  Since the development of the Internet in the 1990s, TMR has regularly refurbished and updated its site.  Beginning in 2010, approximately 15% of its subscribers receive their subscriptions via a web-based service called Texterity.  It is also distributed to 2000 libraries worldwide through Project Muse at Johns Hopkins.

References

External links
Contemporary Authors. Vols. 97–100. Detroit: Gale Research Company, 1981.
Fishmen, Ken. "Writing a First Novel, Part II." The Writer 92 (May 1979): 21–25.
"Speer Morgan." Department of English. University of Missouri–Columbia

American short story writers
American editors
Sewanee: The University of the South alumni
University of Missouri faculty
University of Arkansas alumni
Stanford University alumni
Living people
1946 births
American Book Award winners